Golovino is a rural locality (a village) in Bereznikovskoye Rural Settlement, Sobinsky District, Vladimir Oblast, Russia. The population was 3 as of 2010.

Geography 
The village is located 9 km south-east from Berezniki, 25 km south-east from Sobinka.

References 

Rural localities in Sobinsky District